Pinque may refer to:

Pinque, American rapper and singer. He got popular by posting his songs on SoundCloud
Blechnum penna-marina, the alpine water fern
Pink (ship) (also pinco, pincke), the pinque, a narrow-sterned sailing ship
Pinque, a chain of women's clothing stores owned by Beckie Hughes, 2008 Miss Colorado USA
Pinque, the scarlet fox-hunting coat, see Pink
Pinque Lake, Temagami, Ontario, Canada; a lake in White Bear Forest
Erminio Pinque, founder of Big Nazo

See also
 Pink (disambiguation)
 PINQ (C# API), see Implementations of differentially private analyses